Dawg's Groove is a 2006 album by American musician David Grisman, recorded with his group David Grisman Quintet and so far their latest effort. This release is the first one recorded without violin, as Joe Craven left to pursue his own music. His percussion tasks were taken over by George Marsh. Also, this album would be the last one for Enrique Coria, long-time guitarist for David Grisman Quintet.

Track listing 
All compositions by David Grisman unless otherwise noted.

 Limestones (Grisman)
 La Grande Guignole (Grisman)
 Ella McDonnell (Kerwin)
 Waltz for Lucy (Marsh)
 Zambola (Grisman)
 Tracy's Tune (Grisman)
 Dawg's Groove (Bigelow)
 Cinderella's Fella (Grisman)
 My Friend Dawg (Eakle)
 Blues for Vassar (Grisman)
 (Hidden track)

Personnel
David Grisman – mandolin, mandola
George Marsh – drums, percussion
Matt Eakle – flute, bass flute, tin whistle
Enrique Coria - guitar, whistle
Jim Kerwin – bass

References

David Grisman live albums
2006 live albums
Acoustic Disc live albums